Firebaugh Airport , formerly Q49, is a public airport located one mile (1.6 km) west of Firebaugh, serving Fresno County, California, United States. It is mostly used for general aviation.

Facilities 
Firebaugh Airport covers 37 acres and has one runway:

 Runway 12/30: 3,102 x 60 ft (945 x 18 m), surface: asphalt

References

External links 

Airports in Fresno County, California